The 1951 World Fencing Championships were held in Stockholm, Sweden.

Medal table

Medal summary

Men's events

Women's events

References

1951 in fencing
1951 in Swedish sport
International fencing competitions hosted by Sweden
International sports competitions in Stockholm
World Fencing Championships
1950s in Stockholm